Șofronea is a commune in Arad County, Romania, lies in the Arad Plateau and it stretches over . It is composed of two villages, Sânpaul (Szentpál), and Șofronea.

Population
According to the last census the population of the commune counts 2,566 inhabitants. From an ethnical point of view it has the following structure: 64.0% are Romanians, 35.1% Hungarians, 0.5% Germans, 0.3% Ukrainians and 0.1% are of other or undeclared nationalities.

History
The first documentary record of Șofronea dates back to 1437, while Sânpaul was first mentioned in 1235.

Natives
Magdolna Purgly (1881–1959), wife of Admiral Miklós Horthy
Ovidiu Vezan (b. 1985), footballer

Economy
The commune's present-day economy can be characterized by a powerful dynamic force with significant developments in all the sectors. Commerce and light industry are intensively present on the commune's economic map.

Tourism
The most popular tourist sights are the springs of thermal water with therapeutic effect in the treatment of rheumatic diseases and the complex of the Purgly Castle with its park and households, an architectural complex dating from the end of the 19th century, registered in the national cultural patrimony.

References

Communes in Arad County
Localities in Crișana